Ernst Balser (21 August 1893 – 20 March 1964) was a German architect. His work was part of the architecture event in the art competition at the 1932 Summer Olympics.

References

1893 births
1964 deaths
20th-century German architects
Olympic competitors in art competitions
People from Neu-Isenburg